Kyllinia parentalis is an extinct species of sea snail, a marine gastropod mollusk in the family Mangeliidae.

Description
The length of the shell attains 11.2 mm.

Distribution
Fossils of this marine species were found in Pliocene strata in North Italy and in Pleistocene strata of northwestern Peloponnesus, Greece.

References

External links

parentalis
Gastropods described in 2007